Andres Ammas (25 February 1962, Tallinn – 4 April 2018) was an Estonian politician, representing the Estonian Free Party in the Riigikogu. He was elected with 1,859 votes in the 2015 election.

In 1990–1992, Ammas was a member of the Supreme Council of the Republic of Estonia and voted for the Estonian restoration of Independence on 20 August 1991.

Awards
 5th Class of the Estonian Order of the National Coat of Arms (received 24 February 2002)
 3rd Class of the Estonian Order of the National Coat of Arms (received 23 February 2006)
 Haapsalu badge (2014)

References

1962 births
2018 deaths
Estonian Free Party politicians
Members of the Riigikogu, 2015–2019
Politicians from Tallinn
Recipients of the Order of the National Coat of Arms, 3rd Class
Recipients of the Order of the National Coat of Arms, 5th Class
Voters of the Estonian restoration of Independence
University of Tartu alumni
Estonian Academy of Music and Theatre alumni
20th-century Estonian politicians
21st-century Estonian politicians
Estonian editors